Captain Alexander Rives Skinker (October 13, 1883 – September 26, 1918) was a Medal of Honor recipient during World War I. He graduated from Washington University in St. Louis in 1905. He served in the Missouri National Guard from 1903 to 1908, and entered the Army as a commissioned officer in 1916. He was awarded the medal for leading an attack on German pillboxes in the Hindenburg Line during the Meuse–Argonne offensive.  Skinker was killed in the attack.

Medal of Honor citation
Rank and organization: Captain, U.S. Army, Company I, 138th Infantry, 35th Division.  Place and date: At Cheppy, France; September 26, 1918. Entered service at: St. Louis, Missouri. Birth: October 13, 1883; St. Louis, Missouri. General Orders: War Department, General Orders No. 13 (January 18, 1919).

Citation:

Unwilling to sacrifice his men when his company was held up by terrific machinegun fire from iron pill boxes in the Hindenburg Line, Captain Skinker personally led an automatic rifleman and a carrier in an attack on the machineguns. The carrier was killed instantly, but Captain Skinker seized the ammunition and continued through an opening in the barbed wire, feeding the automatic rifle until he, too, was killed.

Military awards 
Skinker's military decorations and awards include:

See also

List of Medal of Honor recipients
List of Medal of Honor recipients for World War I

References

1883 births
1918 deaths
United States Army Medal of Honor recipients
United States Army officers
American military personnel killed in World War I
World War I recipients of the Medal of Honor
Military personnel from Missouri
Burials in Missouri
Washington University in St. Louis alumni